Bozhou is a rural town in Xinhuang Dong Autonomous County, Hunan, China. The town is bordered to the north by Wanshan District of Tongren, to the east by Xindianping Town of Zhijiang Dong Autonomous County, to the southeast by Butouxiang Miao Ethnic Township, to the west by Huangzhou Town, and to the southwest by Hetan Town.

History
During the Republic of China (1912-1949), it was the second largest commercial port in Xinhuang County.

In 1956, the Bozhou Township was established. In December 1985 it was upgraded to a town.

Geography

The Wushui River, a left tributary of the Yuan River, flows through the town.

Transportation
The National Highway G320, more commonly known as "G320", is an east-west highway passing through the middle town.

The Shanghai–Kunming high-speed railway is a high-speed railway passes across the town northeast to southwest.

References

Xinhuang